Knorr Beeswax Candles is a beeswax candle maker dating to the 1900s and Ferdinand Knorr who opened the business in 1928. His son Henry took over in 1957 and grandson Steven took over in 1982. The candles are sold in 33 colors.

References

External links

Candlemakers
Companies based in San Diego County, California
Manufacturing companies based in California